The Prism brand is used for wireless networking integrated circuit (commonly called "chips") technology from Conexant for wireless LANs. They were formerly produced by Intersil Corporation.

Legacy 802.11b products (Prism 2/2.5/3) 
The open-source HostAP driver supports the IEEE 802.11b Prism 2/2.5/3 family of chips.

Wireless adaptors which use the Prism chipset are known for compatibility, and are preferred for specialist applications such as packet capture.

No win64 drivers are known to exist.

Intersil firmware 
 WEP
 WPA (TKIP), after update
 WPA2 (CCMP), after update

Lucent/Agere 
 WEP
 WPA (TKIP in hardware)

802.11b/g products (Prism54, ISL38xx) 
The chipset has undergone a major redesign for 802.11g compatibility and cost reduction, and newer "Prism54" chipsets are not compatible with their predecessors.

Intersil initially provided a Linux driver for the first Prism54 chips which implemented a large part of the 802.11 stack in the firmware. However, further cost reductions caused a new, lighter firmware to be designed and the amount of on-chip memory to shrink, making it impossible to run the older version of the firmware on the latest chips. In the meantime, the PRISM business was sold to Conexant, which never published information about the newer firmware API that would enable a Linux driver to be written.

However, a reverse engineering effort eventually made it possible to use the new Prism54 chipsets under the Linux and BSD operating systems.

See also 
 HostAP driver for prism chipsets

External links 
 PRISM solutions at Conexant
 GPL drivers and firmware for the ISL38xx-based Prism chipsets (mostly reverse engineered)

Wireless networking hardware